D. Russell Parks Junior High School is a junior high school located in Fullerton, California, United States. It serves students in seventh and eighth grade, and is part of the Fullerton School District. The school has been recognized on two separate occasions with a Blue Ribbon School Award of Excellence by the United States Department of Education, the highest award a North American school can receive. Parks' mascot is the Panther.

As of the 2018-2019 school year, the school had 1050~1100 students and 38 teachers (on an FTE basis), for a student-teacher ratio of 24.6 compared to the average 19.3.

When the school opened, the student population was over 90% Caucasian. With demographic changes in the ensuing years, the school has become majority minority; for 2003–04 its student body was 57% Asian, 13% Hispanic, 15% Caucasian, and 13% African American, and by 2013–14 it was 43% Asian, 29% Hispanic and African American, and 23% Caucasian.In 2018-19 it is 43.1% Asian, 28.5% Hispanic and African American, and 23.4% Caucasian.

As documented in the school's application for its second Blue Ribbon award, student test scores greatly exceed state averages, exemplified by the fact that 82.7% of eighth graders taking the California State Standards Test scored "At or Above Proficient," in contrast to 29.4% of students statewide.

Parks Junior High School mainly feeds into Sunny Hills High School, Troy High School, and Buena Park High School. All offer International Baccalaureate programs.

History
Parks was built in 1972 in honor of Dr. D Russell Parks, former superintendent of the Fullerton Public Elementary School system. The school is located in Fullerton on the corner of Rosecrans Avenue and Parks Road, formerly an unconnected section of Brookhurst Avenue.  The street was renamed in order to conform with a rule instituted by Dr. Parks himself maintaining that schools be named after the streets on which they stand.

The school was constructed to blend in with the surrounding hills and trees. The interior of the school was designed as an open structure, with movable walls and open doorways. The architects believed that the sound of students learning will encourage other kids to learn. As a result, the partially formed walls between classes allow noises from the classes adjacent to be heard. That structure was only in the main buildings (not the portables) before 2015 however. In 2016, the main building was shut down for construction due to asbestos.

Awards and recognition
During the 2008–2009 school year, D. Russell Parks Junior High School was recognized with the Blue Ribbon School Award of Excellence by the United States Department of Education. The school was recognized a second time as a Blue Ribbon School in the 2004–05 school year.

In 2008–09, Parks was recognized as a California Distinguished School, an award given by the California State Board of Education to public schools within the state that best represent exemplary and quality educational programs.

References

External links
Parks Junior High School website
National Center for Education Statistics data for Parks Junior High School

Education in Fullerton, California
Educational institutions established in 1972
Public middle schools in California
Schools in Orange County, California